Regina G. Young (born August 23, 1973) is an American politician and community organizer serving as a member of the Pennsylvania House of Representatives from the 185th district. Elected in November 2020, she assumed office on December 1, 2020.

Education 
Young earned a Bachelor of Arts degree in communications from Central Connecticut State University and a Master of Arts in community development from Eastern University.

Career 
Young has worked as a community organizer, social service worker, and licensed grief counselor. She was also a staffer in the City of Philadelphia Mayor's Office of Education. Young founded the Empowered Community Development Corporation. Young was elected to the Pennsylvania House of Representatives in November 2020 and assumed office on December 1, 2020.

References 

African-American state legislators in Pennsylvania
African-American women in politics
Living people
Central Connecticut State University alumni
Eastern University (United States) alumni
Democratic Party members of the Pennsylvania House of Representatives
Women state legislators in Pennsylvania
21st-century American politicians
21st-century American women politicians
21st-century African-American women
21st-century African-American politicians
1975 births